"10 Things I Hate About You" is a song by American singer Leah Kate from her third extended play, Alive and Unwell (2022). It was released independently on March 23, 2022. The track was written by Kate, Mike Wise and Madi Yanofski, with Wise handling the production. A pop-punk song, Kate wrote a list of things she disliked about an ex-boyfriend from a previous relationship she was trying to get over which later turned into a song. It went viral on the online video platform TikTok.

Background and release
Kate moved to New York to pursue a career in music. She had gotten a job there, but was fired because she was spending "so much time" working on her music. Her 2020 single "Fuck Up the Friendship" was noticed by American entrepreneur Alexis Ohanian on Indify, a startup which helps promote independent artists, who then helped Kate get in touch with digital marketing company Creed Media. The aforementioned company promoted the song on the online video platform TikTok where it went viral, and later on the social networking service Instagram. In 2021, she released her debut album titled What Just Happened?. 

Kate wrote "10 Things I Hate About You" with Mike Wise and Madi Yanofski, while Wise also produced it. The track was written in 2022. The song was independently released on March 23, 2022, for digital download and streaming. It was sent to contemporary hit radio stations by TenThousand and Capitol in the United States on May 10, 2022, and for radio airplay in Italy by Universal on June 3, 2022.

Composition and reception
"10 Things I Hate About You" is a pop-punk song. Although the song shares the same name as a 1999 film, Kate revealed in an interview with iHeartRadio that the movie did not serve as the inspiration for it. She was trying to move on from a past relationship which resulted in her making a list of things she disliked about the ex-boyfriend from that relationship. Kate told Rolling Stone that the list contained 50 reasons "why [she] shouldn't miss him and why [she] should hate him" and that "it very quickly turned into a song".

Rachel Brodsky of Stereogum called it a "punchy fuck-you anthem" and compared it to the likes of Olivia Rodrigo and Gayle. It went viral on TikTok and was used in over 580,000 videos as of June 24, 2022. Commercially, "10 Things I Hate About You" reached the top 30 in Australia and the United Kingdom. In the United States, it peaked at numbers two and 20 on Billboard Bubbling Under Hot 100 Singles and Mainstream Top 40 charts, respectively.

Music video
A visualizer for the song was released on March 25, 2022, on Kate's YouTube channel. The official music video premiered on June 1 and was directed by Jason Lester. In the visual, Kate is giving a press conference, and throughout the video, interspersed shots show her being "surrounded by a gang of girls."

Personnel
Credits adapted from AllMusic.

Leah Katelead vocals, songwriter
Colin Leonardmastering engineer
Mitch McCarthymixing
Mike Wisesongwriter, producer
Madi Yanofskisongwriter

Charts

Certifications

Release history

References

2022 songs
2022 singles
American pop punk songs
Song recordings produced by Mike Wise (record producer)
Songs about infidelity
Songs written by Mike Wise (record producer)